Air Forces Strategic may refer to:

 Eighth Air Force - The numbered air force responsible for the USAF's strategic bombers
 Fourteenth Air Force - The numbered air force fomerly responsible for the USAF's space forces
 Twentieth Air Force - The numbered air force responsible for the USAF's strategic missiles